The list of ship decommissionings in 1933 includes a chronological list of all ships decommissioned in 1933.


See also 

1933
 Ship decommissionings
Ship